Feeding the Flame is the second studio album by English post-punk band Sad Lovers & Giants. It was released in 1983 on the band's record label, Midnight Music.

Track listing

Critical reception 

Trouser Press classified the album as "distressing".

Personnel 

 Garce – vocals
 Cliff Silver – bass guitar, keyboards
 Tristan Garel-Funk – guitar, percussion, backing vocals
 David Wood – keyboards, saxophone, percussion
 Nigel Pollard – drums, percussion

 Technical

 Nick Ralph – production
 Steve Burgess – production
 Joe Bull – engineering
 Trev Wright – sleeve layout (label lettering)
 Jonz – mastering (vinyl cutting)
 Andrée Jenni – album cover photography

References

External links 

 

1983 albums
Sad Lovers & Giants albums